Wikipedia is a free multilingual open source wiki-based online encyclopedia edited and maintained by a community of volunteer editors, started on  as an English-language encyclopedia. Non-English editions were soon created: the German and Catalan editions were created on circa 16 March, the French edition was created on 23 March, and the Swedish edition was created on 23 May.

The Meta-Wiki language committee manages policies on creating new Wikimedia projects. To be eligible, a language must have a valid ISO 639 code, be "sufficiently unique", and have a "sufficient number of fluent users".

Wikipedia edition codes 

Each Wikipedia project has a code, which is used as a subdomain below wikipedia.org. Interlanguage links are sorted by that code as a prefix. The codes are mostly those defined by ISO 639-1 and ISO 639-3, and the decision of which language code to use is usually determined by the IETF language tag policy. Wikipedia projects also vary by how thinly they slice dialects and variants; for example, the English Wikipedia includes most modern varieties of English (American, British, Indian, South African, etc.), but does not include other related languages such as Scots or Old English, both of which have separate Wikipedia projects. Among other pluricentric language editions, the Spanish Wikipedia also includes both Peninsular Castilian and Latin American Spanish, the French Wikipedia includes both European French and Canadian French, the Portuguese Wikipedia includes both European Portuguese and Brazilian Portuguese, and the Malay Wikipedia includes a large number of areal Malayic languages, etc.

Additionally, some Wikipedia projects vary in orthography. The Chinese Wikipedia automatically transliterates from modern Mandarin Chinese into six standard forms: Mainland China, Malaysia (grouped with Singapore until mid-2018) and Singapore in simplified Chinese characters, and Taiwan, Hong Kong and Macau in traditional Chinese characters. Belarusian, however, has separate Wikipedia projects for the official Narkamaŭka (be) and Taraškievica (be-tarask) orthographies.

Nonstandard language codes 
Differences between the ISO mappings and Wikipedia codes include:

Redirects 
 :be-x-old: – redirects to :be-tarask:
 :cz: – redirects to :cs:
 :dk: – redirects to :da:
 :mo: – redirects to :ro:, since November 2017
 :nan: – redirects to :zh-min-nan:
 :nb: – redirects to :no:

Charts

Lists

Basic list 
The table below lists the language editions of Wikipedia roughly sorted by magnitude of the number of active users (registered users who have made at least one edit in the last thirty days).

The Nostalgia Wikipedia is an archive of the English Wikipedia's initial display, while the Simple English Wikipedia merely uses Basic English.

Edition details

Notes for detailed list 
 The "Total pages" column refers to the number of pages in all namespaces, including both articles (the official article count of each wiki) and non-articles (user pages, files, talk pages, "project" pages, categories, redirects, and templates).
 "Users" refers to the number of user accounts, regardless of current activity – not the amount of people or devices using (accessing) Wikipedia.
 "Active users" are registered users who have made at least one edit in the last thirty days.
 "Files" is the number of locally uploaded files. Note that some large Wikipedias don't use local images and rely on Commons completely, so the value "0" is not an error. (see also list of Wikipedias having zero local media files)
 The "Depth" column (Edits/Articles × Non-Articles/Articles × [1−Stub-ratio]) is a rough indicator of a Wikipedia's quality, showing how frequently its articles are updated. It does not refer to academic quality.
 The statistics are derived from API:Siteinfo and updated at Data:Wikipedia statistics/data.tab every six hours, and are displayed with  via .
 When the Northern Luri Wikipedia was closed due to not actually being written in Northern Luri, all articles except the main page were deleted. This produces an abnormal depth since the deleted edits and remaining non-articles are still counted.

Detailed list 
Notes cannot be added directly into table header - please see "Notes" section just above

Statistics totals

Number of Wikipedias by language families and groups

See also 

 List of online encyclopedias
 History of Wikipedia
 Languages used on the Internet

References

External links 
 Wikipedia portal
 
 
 
 

 
Wikipedia statistics
Wikipedias
Lists about Wikipedia